El ojo de la cerradura is a 1964 Argentine film.

Cast

 Janet Margolin

Reception
The film was received well at international film festivals.

Awards
The film won the 1967 Silver Condor Award for Best Director.

References

External links
 

1964 films
1960s Spanish-language films
Argentine black-and-white films
1960s Argentine films